Blazing the Overland Trail is a 1956 American Western Serial film directed by Spencer Gordon Bennet and starring Lee Roberts. It was the 57th and last serial produced by Columbia and the last American serial ever produced by any studio (either major or minor). Republic Pictures, the only other serial-producing US studio in the mid 1950s, had ceased its serial production the previous year with King of the Carnival.

Plot
Rance Devlin intends to build his own empire in the American West using his Black Raiders and allied Indians to do so. Only US Army scout Tom Bridger, allied with Pony Express rider Ed Marr and U.S. Army cavalry Captain Frank Carter, can stop him.

Cast
 Lee Roberts as Tom Bridger
 Dennis Moore as Ed Marr
 Norma Brooks as Lola Martin
 Gregg Barton as Captain Carter
 Don C. Harvey as Rance Devlin
 Lee Morgan as Alby
 Pierce Lyden as Bragg
 Edward Coch as Carl
 Reed Howes as Dunn
 Kermit Maynard as Al 
 Pete Kellett as Pete 
 Al Ferguson as Fergie

Production
The film uses stock footage from Overland with Kit Carson.

Chapter titles
 Gun Emperor of the West
 Riding the Danger Trail
 The Black Riders
 Into the Flames
 Trapped in the Runaway Wagon
 Rifles for Redskins
 Midnight Attack
 Blast at Gunstock Pass
 War at the Wagon Camp
 Buffalo Stampede
 Into the Fiery Blast
 Cave-in
 Bugle Call
 Blazing Peril
 Raiders Unmasked
Source:

See also
 List of American films of 1956
List of film serials by year
List of film serials by studio

References

External links
 
 

1956 films
1956 Western (genre) films
American Western (genre) films
American black-and-white films
Columbia Pictures film serials
1950s English-language films
Films directed by Spencer Gordon Bennet
Films with screenplays by George H. Plympton
1950s American films